Adami was an automobile manufactured in Florence, Italy.

History
Guido Adami was a race driver who started a repair shop, and moved to building cars in 1900.  They produced a single model, the Rondine, with a 16 hp engine developed in house.  It was first displayed at the Turin Motor Show of 1902.  Production ended in 1906.

References

Defunct motor vehicle manufacturers of Italy
Companies based in Tuscany
Cars introduced in 1900
Veteran vehicles
Vehicle manufacturing companies established in 1900
Italian companies established in 1900